The Angel on the Roof: The Stories of Russell Banks (2000) is a collection of short stories by Russell Banks. It consists of a total of thirty-one previously published stories, including twenty-two stories that appeared in earlier short story collections, along with nine that were previously uncollected.

Contents
Twenty-two of the thirty-one stories that Banks selected for this volume were published in four earlier collections, although Banks writes that many of the stories "have been revised for this edition". The previously collected stories were originally published in the following volumes by Banks: Searching for Survivors (New York: Fiction Collective/ Braziller, 1975); Trailerpark (New York: HarperCollins, 1981); Success Stories (New York: HarperCollins, 1986).

In his "Note" appended at the end of this volume, Russell Banks writes the following:

Previously collected stories
The following is a list of the previously collected stories republished in The Angel on the Roof, under the titles of the collections in which they originally appeared:

From Searching for Survivors (1975)
“Searching for Survivors” 
“With Ché in New Hampshire” 
“Theory of Flight” (originally “With Ché at Kitty Hawk”) 
“The Neighbor” 
“The Lie” 
“Defenseman” 

From The New World (1978)
“The Rise of the Middle Class”
“Indisposed” 
“The Caul” 

From Trailerpark (1981)
“The Guinea Pig Lady”
“Black Man and White Woman in Dark Green Rowboat” 
“Dis Bwoy, Him Gwan” 
“Comfort”
“The Burden”
“Child Screams and Looks Back at You” 
“The Fisherman” 

From Success Stories (1986)
“Queen for a Day”
“The Fish” 
“Success Story”
“Mistake”
“Sarah Cole: A Type of Love Story” 
“Firewood”

Uncollected stories
The previously uncollected stories in The Angel on the Roof are as follows (with the original publication/periodical in parenthesis): 

“Plains of Abraham” (Esquire)
“Djinn” (Esquire) 
“Lobster Night” (Esquire)
“The Visit” (The Village Voice Literary Supplement)
“Xmas” (The Boston Globe Magazine)
“The Moor” (Conjunctions)
“Cow-Cow” (GQ)
“Quality Time” (Ploughshares)
“Assisted Living” (?)

See also
2000 in literature

Notes

References
Russell Banks, The Angel on the Roof: The Stories of Russell Banks, 2000.  (paperback);  (e-pub edition, July 2011)

2000 short story collections
American short story collections
Books by Russell Banks
HarperCollins books